The Hokkaido American Football Association (北海道アメリカンフットボール協会) or HAFA is an American college football league made up of colleges and universities on the island of Hokkaido, Japan.

Overview
The Hokkaido American Football Association is the highest level of collegiate football in the prefecture of Hokkaido. Eleven universities and colleges compete.
The League was founded on April 1, 1975.

Member schools

League 1

League 2

Former members

Champions

League 1 champions

League 2 champions

Pine Bowl

The champion of the Hokkaidō League plays in the Pine Bowl against the champion of the Tohoku Collegiate American Football Association for the North Japan championship.

References

External links
  (Japanese)

 
American football in Japan
American football leagues
College athletics conferences in Japan
Sport in Hokkaido
Sports organizations established in 1975
1975 establishments in Japan